Llwyncelyn is a Welsh place name. It may refer to:

 Llwyncelyn, Ceredigion
 Llwyncelyn, Rhondda Cynon Taf
 Llwyn-celyn Farmhouse, Llanvihangel Crucorney, a Grade I-listed building in Monmouthshire
 Llwyn-celyn farmhouse, Shirenewton, a Grade II-listed building in Monmouthshire
 Llwyn Celyn Fault, a geological fault
 Llwyn y Celyn Wetland, a Site of Special Scientific Interest in Monmouthshire

See also
 Llyn Celyn